Samuel Elias do Carmo Soares, better known as Samuel, is a defender since the basic categories of the Atlético Mineiro.

Career
Up to the professional team in the 2008 season, when he made only one game. In 2009, went on to win with the odds so far, technical Emerson Leão. But in a match against Rio Branco-MG, the first phase of the Mineiro, was injured and out of plans for the entire season. Already in 2010, under the command of Vanderlei Luxemburgo, was again among the group's professional team. However, he made only two friendlies and was loaned to Paços de Ferreira of Portugal for two seasons.

He has participated in the Brazilian Football Team U-18.

Career statistics
(Correct )

Contract
 Atlético Mineiro.

References

External links
 Galo Digital

1988 births
Living people
Brazilian footballers
Brazilian expatriate footballers
Clube Atlético Mineiro players
Expatriate footballers in Portugal
Primeira Liga players
F.C. Paços de Ferreira players
Association football defenders